Rogen Ladon (born November 10, 1993) is a Filipino amateur boxer. He first took up boxing in 2007, and won medals in international tournaments such as the Asian Amateur Boxing Championships and Southeast Asian Games as well as in smaller tournaments such as the 2012 Taipei City Cup and 2011 Hong Kong International Tournament.

Locally, Ladon has won at the Filipino National Open Junior Championships at the 46 kg category winning a bronze at the 2008 edition and a gold at the 2009 edition. He won a gold medal at the 2013 Philippine National Games in the 49 kg category. Ladon was the sparring partner of Mark Anthony Barriga for the 2012 Olympics. He replaced an injured Barriga at the 2013 Asian Championships. His brother Joegin Ladon is also an international boxer.

Ladon has qualified for the 2016 Summer Olympics after finishing second at the Asia & Oceania Olympic qualifiers. He also previously attempted to qualify by winning at least a silver at the 2015 AIBA World Boxing Championships but Ladon only managed to gain a bronze medal.

References

External links 
 
 
 
 

1993 births
Living people
Filipino male boxers
Boxers from Negros Occidental
Boxers at the 2016 Summer Olympics
Olympic boxers of the Philippines
Boxers at the 2018 Asian Games
Asian Games silver medalists for the Philippines
Asian Games medalists in boxing
Medalists at the 2018 Asian Games
Southeast Asian Games medalists in boxing
Southeast Asian Games silver medalists for the Philippines
Competitors at the 2015 Southeast Asian Games
Southeast Asian Games gold medalists for the Philippines
Competitors at the 2019 Southeast Asian Games
AIBA World Boxing Championships medalists
Light-flyweight boxers
Competitors at the 2021 Southeast Asian Games